Missiroli is an Italian surname. Notable people with the surname include:

Antonio Missiroli (born 1955), Italian researcher, editorialist, lecturer and policy adviser in the European Institutions
Mario Missiroli (1934–2014), Italian stage, television and film director
Simone Missiroli (born 1986), Italian footballer

Italian-language surnames